

The Fairchild Model 41 Foursome was a light aircraft developed in the United States in the late 1920s and produced as the  Model 42 Foursome. It was a conventional high-wing, strut-braced monoplane with fixed tailwheel undercarriage. The pilot and three passengers were seated within a fully enclosed cabin, and the aircraft generally resembled a scaled-down version of Fairchild's successful FC-2 design. Two prototypes were built as the Model 41 and Model 41A leading to the Model 42 production version which was built in a small series. This production version differed from the prototypes in having a redesigned, strut-braced empennage in place of the wire-braced unit of the earlier aircraft, and a more powerful version of the Wright Whirlwind powerplant.

Variants
Model 41 FoursomeFirst prototype four seat cabin monoplane, powered by a  Wright J-5, one built

Model 41A FoursomeSecond prototype four seat cabin monoplane, powered by a  Wright J-5, one built.

Model 42 FoursomeProduction four seat cabin monoplane, powered by  Wright J-6 engines, six built and two converted from the 41 and 41A.

Survivors
NC106M has been rebuilt to airworthy standard in Alaska as of July 2008, powered by a Pratt & Whitney R-985 Wasp Junior and converted to seat 7 passengers, with rear round windows added.

Specifications (Model 42)

References

 
 aerofiles.com

1920s United States civil utility aircraft
42
High-wing aircraft
Single-engined tractor aircraft
Aircraft first flown in 1927